North Kolaka Regency is a regency in the northwest part of Southeast Sulawesi province of Indonesia. It covers an area of 2,924.46 km2, and had a population of 121,476 at the 2010 Census, and 137,700 at the 2020 Census. The principal town lies at Lasusua.

Administration 
The North Kolaka Regency is divided into fifteen districts (kecamatan), tabulated below from south to north, with their areas (as given by the regency BPS) and their populations at the 2010 Census and the 2020 Census. The table also includes the location of the district administrative centres and the number of villages (totalling 133 - comprising 127 rural desa and 6 urban kelurahan) in each district.

Note that an asterisk in the final column indicates the number includes one kelurahan (in each case with the same name as the district administrative centre).

Climate
Lasusua, the seat of the regency has a tropical rainforest climate (Af) with moderate rainfall in October and November and heavy to very heavy rainfall in the remaining months.

Villages
 

Walasiho

References

Regencies of Southeast Sulawesi